The Knitting Girl is a painting by nineteenth-century French artist William-Adolphe Bouguereau in 1869. The painting is currently held in the Joslyn Art Museum in Omaha, Nebraska in the United States.

See also
 William-Adolphe Bouguereau gallery

References

External links
William-Adolphe Bouguereau at the Web Museum
The Knitting Girl at the Joslyn Art Museum

Paintings by William-Adolphe Bouguereau
1869 paintings
Paintings in Nebraska